Neath Port Talbot County Borough stretches from the south coast of Wales up to the southern edge of the Brecon Beacons. The 93 scheduled monuments include 43 prehistoric sites which include a stone circle, standing stones, burial mounds and chambered tombs. The six Roman sites are all connected to military occupation. There are 18 medieval sites which include abbeys, castles and churches. The  26 post-medieval sites are mostly connected to over 400 years of industrial activity in the area. All of the sites on this list (and the whole of Neath Port Talbot County Borough) are within the historic county of Glamorgan. Five of the sites lie on or cross the border into neighbouring counties, and are included on both lists.

Scheduled monuments have statutory protection. It is illegal to disturb the ground surface or any standing remains. The compilation of the list is undertaken by Cadw Welsh Historic Monuments, which is an executive agency of the National Assembly of Wales. The list of scheduled monuments below is supplied by Cadw with additional material from RCAHMW and Glamorgan-Gwent Archaeological Trust.

Scheduled monuments in Neath Port Talbot

See also
List of Cadw properties
List of castles in Wales
List of hill forts in Wales
Historic houses in Wales
List of monastic houses in Wales
List of museums in Wales
List of Roman villas in Wales
Grade I listed buildings in Neath Port Talbot
Grade II* listed buildings in Neath Port Talbot

References
Coflein is the online database of RCAHMW: Royal Commission on the Ancient and Historical Monuments of Wales, GGAT is the Glamorgan-Gwent Archaeological Trust, Cadw is the Welsh Historic Monuments Agency

Neath Port Talbot